Cho Jae-Yong  (born 21 April 1984) is a South Korean footballer who played as a defender for Busan TC in the Korea National League.

External links 

1984 births
Living people
Association football defenders
South Korean footballers
Gyeongnam FC players
Gimcheon Sangmu FC players
K League 1 players
Korea National League players